This is a list of compositions by Frederik Magle.

Orchestra 

 Concerto for organ and orchestra The infinite second (1994)
 Symphonic Lego Fantasia for piano and orchestra, commissioned by the Lego Group (1995–96)
 Rising of a new day (1998)
 Lys på din vej (Light on your path) – orchestral version (1999-2000)
 Cantabile, symphonic suite consisting of three symphonic poems for orchestra, choir, and soloists  (2004–2009)

Choir 

 A Christmas child mini-musical for choir, flute, recorder, marimba, percussion, bass, and piano (arrangement by Niels Thybo, orchestration by Karsten Vogel, lyrics by Mimi Heinrich) (1987)
 We Are Afraid Cantata for choir, flute, clarinet, percussion, strings, piano, and organ (1988)
 Der Die Das, opera for 2 soloists and choir (by Hotel Pro Forma) (1993)
 Årstidernes sang for choir and organ (1995)
 A newborn child, before eternity, God! Christmas cantata, for brass band, choir, soloists, organ and percussion (1996)
 Cantata to Saint Cecilia for soloists, choir, children's choir, and chamber orchestra (1998)
 The Hope for brass band, choir, organ and percussion, written in memory of the battle of Copenhagen (2001)
 Phoenix for mixed choir and organ or piano four-hands (2003)
 Magnificat for soprano, mixed choir and organ (2010)
 Allehelgenmesse (All Hallows Mass) for soprano, choir, cello and organ (2011)
 The Halloween Present for chamber orchestra, choir, harpsichord, organ, and sound effects (2012)

Songs and Hymns 

 30 hymns (1985)
 20 songs based on fairy tales by Hans Christian Andersen (1986–92)
 2 songs, Cristopher Robin and Husmorens morgen with lyrics by Bent Friis Alsinger (1990)
 Alive – Anthem for the pregnant woman for soprano and piano (2012)

Organ 

 Fantasia for pipe organ No.1 in C Major (1988)
 Fantasia for organ No.2 The Ocean (1988)
 Fantasia for organ No.3 in E-flat minor The Gate (1989)
 Rhapsody for organ in c minor (1991)
 Symphony for organ No. 1 (1990)
 Festive Prelude for organ (1992)
 Toccata Impression for organ (1992)
 Symphony for organ No. 2 Let there be light (1993)
 "Ilden" from Elementerne (The Elements) (1995)
 Dåbspræludium (1999)
 Fantasia for organ Forårssol (1999)
 Antarktis for organ four-hands (1999)
 Menneskets Årtusind (Human's Millenium) (2000)
 Cantilena (2003)
 Viva Voce (2008)
 At Blive (To Become) (2009)
 Like a Flame, 22 pieces for organ (2009-2010)

Piano 

 Fantasia for piano i a-minor (1990)
 A small etude for piano (1991)
 3 etudes for piano (1993)
 Flammer for Frihed (Flames for Freedom) (1998)
 Fantasie-Impromptu No. 17 (2002)
 Sunset for piano (2007)

Chamber music 

 Sonata for violin and organ Vox Humana (1989)
 Duo for violin and cello (1990)
 Duo for violin and piano A thought (1991)
 Sonata for cello and organ From the earth (1992)
 Fantasia for solo cello Sun Dance (1992)
 Lys på din vej (Light on your path) for organ and brass quintet, written for the christening of Prince Nikolai of Denmark (1999)
 Variations and theme Rejse i Tid (Journey in Time) for violin and piano (1999)
 Decet Dage og Nætter (Days and Nights) (1999)
 Intermezzo for brass quintet (2001)
 Kosmos for trumpet and organ (2001)
 Dåbens Pagt (Pact of the Baptism) for brass quintet, written for the christening of Prince Felix of Denmark (2002)
 The Fairest of Roses (Den Yndigste Rose), fanfare for two trumpets and organ (2017)

Other 

 Solo for violin Spring Dance (1989)
 Electronic ballet In the Universe (1992)
 Sonata for solo violin A Fairytale (1992)
 Handle with care – Life inside ballet. HD recording (tape) with song, synthesizers and sound effects (1995)
 The March of Joy for brass band (1996)
 En Anden Verden – Indgangen (Another World – The Entrance) for brass band (1997)
 Te Deum for brass band (2001)

References

Magle